"Parachute Woman" is a song by the Rolling Stones featured on their 1968 album Beggars Banquet.

Inspiration and recording
Written by Mick Jagger and Keith Richards, "Parachute Woman" is a blues song and is one of the Beggars Banquet songs recorded on a cassette player and double-tracked for effect. Bill Janovitz comments in his review of the song:

Mick Jagger is on lead vocals and Keith Richards is on electric lead guitar, and Brian Jones plays acoustic rhythm guitar (this and his famous slide from No Expectations are his only guitar contributions on the album). Both Mick Jagger and Brian Jones play harmonica (Brian plays through the song's verses, while Mick's comes in at the end of the song). Charlie Watts provides drums and Bill Wyman plays the bass. This song can be considered Brian Jones second biggest contribution after his slide guitar solo from No Expectations, but here he plays two important instruments... rhythm guitar and the lead harmonica. 

"Parachute Woman" was only performed live by the Rolling Stones twice. The first performance was during the 1968 Rock and Roll Circus (Brian Jones plays rhythm but can hardly be heard, so that version is mostly Keith's staccato fills held up by the rhythm section) and appears on the subsequent album.  It would also be performed once during the 2002 Licks Tour, more than 30 years after its initial live debut.

Personnel
Mick Jaggervocals, harmonica (coda)
Keith Richardselectric guitar
Brian Jones acoustic guitar, harmonica
Bill Wymanbass 
Charlie Wattsdrums

References

1968 songs
The Rolling Stones songs
Songs written by Jagger–Richards
Song recordings produced by Jimmy Miller